Hugh Crofton (died 20 October 1767) was an Irish politician.

Croften was the Member of Parliament for Leitrim in the Irish House of Commons between 1743 and 1760. He was the father of Sir Morgan Crofton, 1st Baronet.

References

Year of birth unknown
1767 deaths
Irish MPs 1727–1760
Members of the Parliament of Ireland (pre-1801) for County Leitrim constituencies